Bobin Singh (born 1 February 1981) is an Indian cricketer. He made his first-class debut for Manipur in the 2018–19 Ranji Trophy on 22 December 2018.

References

External links
 

1981 births
Living people
Indian cricketers
Manipur cricketers
Place of birth missing (living people)